"Breezin'" is an instrumental song composed by American singer and musician Bobby Womack. It was originally recorded in December 1970 by the influential Hungarian jazz guitarist Gábor Szabó, in partnership with Womack himself. The song was originally released in 1971 on Szabó's album High Contrast. The song was released as a single in April 1971 in the United States and in 1972 in the Netherlands. The single reached No. 43 on the R&B chart the same year. "Breezin'" was produced by Tommy LiPuma.
Bobby Womack did write some lyrics for the song, but these were never officially released. However, Womack performs the song himself with the lyrics he could remember on his DVD Raw, released in 2010.

Gábor Szabó version (1971)

Track listing
The "Breezin'"s full length on the Szabó's album High Contrast is 3:11. The length of only 3:03 is an edited version of the single.

Chart position

Personnel
Gábor Szabó – Electric guitar, Acoustic guitar
Bobby Womack – Songwriter, Electric rhythm guitar
Jim Keltner – Drums
Felix "Flaco" Falcon – Congas
Phil Upchurch – Bass
Rene Hall – String arrangements
Carmelo Garcia – Percussion
Bruce Botnick – Audio engineer
Tommy LiPuma – Tambourine, Gourd percussion, record producer

George Benson version (1976)

Five years after Gábor Szabó's original recording, the song became even better known for a successful rerecording by singer and guitarist George Benson, whose 1976 cover was the title track of his album Breezin'. His version was recorded in January 1976 and released as a single in September of the same year, entering the American charts in October. Like Szabó's original, Benson's cover was produced by Tommy LiPuma. The album and single were released by Warner Bros. Records.

Track listing

7" single
The "Breezin'"s full length on the Benson's album Breezin' is 5:40. The length of only 5:20 is an edited version of the 7" single.

12" single

Chart history

Personnel
Songwriter – Bobby Womack
Lead Guitar, Vocals – George Benson
Bass, Rhythm Guitar – Phil Upchurch
Conductor, Arranged By – Claus Ogerman
Drums – Harvey Mason
Flute - Bennie Maupin
Electric Piano, Keyboards – Ronnie Foster
Percussion – Ralph MacDonald
Piano, Clavinet – Jorge Dalto
Producer – Tommy LiPuma

Other versions
The song was also recorded twice by saxophonist and arranger Hank Crawford: first in 1980 with guitarist Calvin Newborn for their collaborative album Centerpiece and again in 1996 for his album  Tight. Additionally, Masayoshi Takanaka recorded a city pop version of the song, released on his 1978 album On Guitar.

References

External links
 
 
 
 
 Page of "Breezin'" by Gábor Szabó at Discogs
 Page of "Breezin'" by Gábor Szabó at 45cat
 Page of "Breezin'" by George Benson at Discogs
 Page of "Breezin'" by George Benson at 45cat

1970 songs
1971 singles
1976 singles
Bobby Womack songs
George Benson songs
Songs written by Bobby Womack
Blue Thumb Records singles
Warner Records singles
Songs involved in plagiarism controversies
1970s instrumentals
Soul jazz songs
Smooth jazz songs